La Nucia is a municipality in the comarca of Marina Baixa, Alicante, Valencian Community, Spain. It borders the municipalities of Altea, Callosa d'En Sarrià, Benidorm, Polop and L'Alfàs del Pi.

La Nucia is located in a fruit valley between Benidorm and Callosa d'En Sarrià, 3 km from the coast of Altea. The urban center is on a promontory overlooking the Mediterranean Sea, 51 km north of Alicante and 8 km north of Benidorm.

The municipality includes the following housing estates: Barranco Hondo, Coloma, Bello Horizonte, Panorama, and El Tossal.

History 

The name derives from the Arabic word Naziha ("delicious"). It was given by the king James I of Aragon to Beltran de Bellpuig. At the beginning of the seventeenth century, it formed part of the barony of Benidorm and belonged to Alfonso Fajardo, Baron of Polop, of the house of Fajardo de Mendoza.

La Nucia became an independent municipality in 1705, after splitting from the barony of Polop. The parish church, dedicated to La Immaculada Concepció (Immaculate Conception), was constructed in the 18th century.

Sport
CF La Nucía is based at Estadi Olímpic Camilo Cano in the municipality.

References

Municipalities in the Province of Alicante
Marina Baixa